Sully Square is a census designated place in Fairfax County, Virginia, United States.

References

Census-designated places in Fairfax County, Virginia
Census-designated places in Virginia